Arthur Hugh ("Podge") Brodhurst ( – ) was an English cricketer and schoolteacher. 

Brodhurst was educated at Malvern College and Pembroke College, Cambridge. He played first-class cricket for Cambridge University and Gloucestershire from 1937 to 1946, re-appearing in a single first-class game for MCC in Canada in 1951. During the Second World War he was in the Royal Artillery commanding anti-aircraft units in the North African desert; later he was liaison officer with the Czech Armoured Brigade and ended the war as town major of Haarlem, where he re-introduced cricket to Holland. He taught at Winchester College from 1946 to 1978, including three periods in charge of cricket, and was a housemaster from 1954 to 1970.

Brodhurst married Meg, daughter of the cricket historian Harry Altham who was also a housemaster at Winchester College. They had three children.

Notes

External links

1916 births
2006 deaths
People educated at Malvern College
Alumni of Pembroke College, Cambridge
English cricketers
Gloucestershire cricketers
Cambridge University cricketers
Marylebone Cricket Club cricketers
Oxford and Cambridge Universities cricketers
British Army personnel of World War II
Royal Artillery officers
Winchester College
English schoolteachers